The Animation Show is a touring festival of animated short films that was first held in fall 2003. It was sponsored by MTV, and was created by award-winning animators Mike Judge and Don Hertzfeldt. Due to its association with MTV, the showcase was not intended for children, as the festival was more aimed at adult audiences, with its main kid-friendly equivalent being Nickelodeon's Nicktoons Film Festival, presented by Frederator Studios.

Following the demise of other American touring festivals of animation, such as Spike and Mike's Classic Festival of Animation, the stated purpose of the Animation Show was to bring animated short films back into proper cinemas, where most of them were intended to be seen, and to "free these artists from the dungeons of Internet exhibition". It was the first-ever festival of animation to be curated by working animators and was described as a "passion project" by its creators, not something intended to turn a giant profit. A sister series of Animation Show DVD volumes are also available from MTV Home Video and Paramount Home Entertainment, but the producers stress that the theatrical and DVD lineups are intentionally a little bit different, to encourage audiences to not just wait for the DVD but to visit the cinema and view these films properly. As stated on the Animation Show programs and flyers, once the current edition of the Show is out of theaters, it's "gone forever".

Mike Judge and Don Hertzfeldt programmed the first three Animation Show programs together. Don Hertzfeldt parted ways with the festival in 2008 and the fourth season of the Animation Show was released without his involvement.

History

2003
The first season's 2003 tour visited over 200 North American theaters with occasional appearances from the producers (Mike Judge and Don Hertzfeldt) and Q&A's with many of the award-winning filmmakers involved. The program included "everything from forgotten classics to the very latest in computer animation". This included many current Academy Award nominees, as well as the restoration of a 5-minute excerpt from Ward Kimball's 1957 Disney film, "Mars and Beyond". The tour concluded with the DVD release of Animation Show, Volume One.

2005 
The second Animation Show toured throughout 2005, featuring Bill Plympton's Guard Dog, the 1999 National Film Board of Canada's classic When the Day Breaks, Don Hertzfeldt's The Meaning of Life and new films by animators Peter Cornwell, Georges Schwizgebel and PES.

2007  
The third season of The Animation Show began its nationwide release in January 2007, featuring the return of Mike Judge's Beavis and Butt-Head. The third tour also showcased new work by animators Joanna Quinn, PES, Bill Plympton, and Don Hertzfeldt.

2008 
The fourth Animation Show was released in 2008. It included new work by animators PES, Bill Plympton and Georges Schwizgebel as well as the Academy Award nominated short This Way Up.

See also
 Animation Show of Shows
 Fantastic Animation Festival
 International Tournée of Animation
 Spike and Mike's Festival of Animation

Notes

References

External links 
 
 
 
 
 
 Official YouTube channel

2003 establishments in the United States
Film festivals held in multiple countries
Films directed by Don Hertzfeldt
Films directed by Mike Judge
Short film festivals in the United States
Recurring events established in 2003
2000s in animation
Animation film festivals in the United States
MTV animated films